Red Star Stadium is a multi-use stadium in Omsk, Russia.  It is currently used mostly for football matches.  The stadium holds 18,000 people.

Sports venues built in the Soviet Union

Football venues in Russia
Sport in Omsk
Buildings and structures in Omsk Oblast